Bratstvo ("brotherhood" in Slavic languages) was a network of religious communities in the 16 and 17th centuries.

Bratstvo may also refer to:

Football clubs
 FK Bratstvo Cijevna, in Podgorica, Montenegro
 FK Bratstvo Lisičani, in Kičevo, Republic of Macedonia
 FK Bratstvo Krnjača, in Belgrade, Serbia
 NK Bratstvo Gračanica, in Gračanica, Bosnia and Herzegovina
 FK Bratstvo Bratunac, a football club in Bosnia and Herzegovina
 FK Bratstvo Resen, the former name of FK Jildirimspor, in Resen, Republic of Macedonia

Industry
 Bratstvo, an ammunition factory in Novi Travnik, Bosnia and Herzegovina
 Bratstvo, a restaurant once owned by Biserka in Macedonia
 Bratstvo, a steel manufacturing company in Aleksandrovo, Subotica, Serbia
 Bratstvo pipeline, part of the natural gas transmission system of Ukraine

Other
 SS Bratstvo (1963), a Russian multi-purpose freighter
 Bratstvo (party), a political group founded by Dmytro Korchynsky in 2002 in Ukraine
 Bratstvo (weekly), a Bulgarian-language newspaper in Serbia
 Bratstvo, a term for clans in the tribes of Montenegro
 Bratstvo-Telep, a local community in Telep, a neighborhood of Novi Sad, Vojvodina, Serbia

sl:Bratstvo (razločitev)